Robert Cooke Goolrick (August 4, 1948 – April 29, 2022) was an American writer whose first novel sold more than five million copies.

Biography 
Robert Goolrick grew up in the 1950s in the small college town of Lexington, Virginia. His mother was a homemaker and his father a college professor, and he had two siblings. When Goolrick lost his job as an advertising creative director and copywriter, he turned to memoir writing. The End of the World As We Know It: Scenes from a Life highlighted "the excesses and failures of both the social underpinnings of the time and his parents' inevitable alcohol-fueled decline, culminating in a devastating portrayal of the sexual abuse he suffered as a child." He sought "something resembling peace" in his writing. After years living in New York City, Goolrick returned to Virginia. In 2015, he moved from Whitestone, Virginia, to Weems, Virginia. He reads from his book "A Reliable Wife" in a video posted for his Facebook followers to which he added, "For people who can't come to a bookstore, this is what I look like and what I sound like, thanks to my friend Ashraf Meer."

Robert Goolrick's books were also widely acclaimed abroad, notably in France, where he made a brilliant career and was loved both by the press and the readers. He was awarded several prestigious literary prizes there, among which the Prix Fitzgerald (for La chute des princes) and the Grand Prix des Lectrices de Elle (for Arrive un vagabond).

He died from complications related to COVID-19 in April 2022, during the COVID-19 pandemic in Virginia. Goolrick is buried in Old Chapel Cemetery in Millwood, Virginia, along with his ancestor, writer John Esten Cooke (1830–1886).

Works
2007: The End of the World as We Know It: Scenes from a Life, Algonquin Books, 
2009: A Reliable Wife, Algonquin Books, 
2012: Heading Out to Wonderful, Algonquin Books, 
2015: The Fall of Princes, Algonquin Books, 
2018: The Dying of the Light, Harper,

Works translated into French 
2009: Une femme simple et honnête, [« A Reliable Wife »], translation by  Marie de Prémonville, Paris, Éditions Anne Carrière, 413 p. 
2010: Féroces, [« The End of the World as We Know It: Scenes from a Life »], translated by Marie de Prémonville, 254 p. .
2012: Arrive un vagabond, [« Heading Out to Wonderful »], translation by Marie de Prémonville, Éditions Anne Carrière, 319 p. 
- Prix Laurent-Bonelli Virgin-Lire 2012
- Grand prix des lectrices de Elle 2013.
2014: La Chute des princes [« The Fall of Princes »], translation by Marie de Prémonville, Éditions Anne Carrière, 360 p. .
2017: Après l’incendie, followed by the short story Trois lamentations,translation by Marie de Prémonville, Éditions Anne Carrière, 300 p. 
2019: Ainsi passe la gloire du monde,translation by Marie de Prémonville, Éditions Anne Carrière, 191 p.

Prizes 
2013: Grand prix des lectrices de Elle for Arrive un vagabond (Heading Out to Wonderful)
2015: Prix Fitzgerald for La Chute des princes

References

External links 
 Beautiful People, Wretched Childhood on The New York Times
 Robert Goolrick, author of the best-seller A Reliable Wife, talks about writing as the path to something resembling peace on Nashville scene
 Robert Goolrick on KirKus
 Goolrick's life spins from 'tortured' to 'Wonderful' on USA Today
 Robert Goolrick > Quotes on Goodreads
  'A Reliable Wife' by Robert Goolrick on {Washington Post (8 April 2009)
 Robert Goolrick on Book reporter
 The End of the World as We Know It: Scenes from a Life by Robert Goolrick on bookslut.com

1948 births
2022 deaths
21st-century American novelists
Writers from Virginia
People from Charlottesville, Virginia
Deaths from the COVID-19 pandemic in Virginia